The New Zealand national roller hockey team is the national team side of New Zealand at international roller hockey. Usually is part of FIRS Roller Hockey B World Cup.

New Zealand squad - 2010 FIRS Roller Hockey B World Cup

Team Staff
 General Manager:Roger Bedford
 Mechanic:

Coaching Staff
 Head Coach: Russell Clark
 Assistant:

Titles

References

External links
Official website of New Zealand Federation of Roller Hockey

National Roller Hockey Team
Roller hockey
National roller hockey (quad) teams